John McEnroe and Michael Stich defeated Jim Grabb and Richey Reneberg in the final, 5–7, 7–6(7–5), 3–6, 7–6(7–5), 19–17 to win the gentlemen's doubles title at the 1992 Wimbledon Championships.

John Fitzgerald and Anders Järryd were the defending champions, but lost in the second round to McEnroe and Stich. This was the second year in a row that an unseeded team featuring McEnroe defeated the defending champions.

The 1992 final featured two unheralded teams that defeated the number one and number two seeds in the draw respectively on their way to the final. Fitzgerald and Järryd, the defending champions and number one seeds, had featured in three of the past four finals, but lost in the second round to the unseeded duo of McEnroe and Stich. Todd Woodbridge and Mark Woodforde, the number two seeds who would go on to win the championship the next five years in a row, were ousted here in the semifinals by Grabb and Reneberg.

Seeds

  John Fitzgerald /  Anders Järryd (second round)
  Todd Woodbridge /  Mark Woodforde (semifinals)
  Kelly Jones /  Rick Leach (third round)
  Jim Grabb /  Richey Reneberg (final)
  Scott Davis /  David Pate (quarterfinals)
  Grant Connell /  Glenn Michibata (second round)
  Tom Nijssen /  Cyril Suk (first round)
  Ken Flach /  Todd Witsken (third round)
  Mark Kratzmann /  Wally Masur (quarterfinals)
  Wayne Ferreira /  Piet Norval (first round)
  Steve DeVries /  David Macpherson (third round)
  Luke Jensen /  Laurie Warder (third round)
  Guy Forget /  Jakob Hlasek (semifinals)
  Javier Frana /  Leonardo Lavalle (third round)
  Kent Kinnear /  Sven Salumaa (third round)
  Omar Camporese /  Goran Ivanišević (first round)

Qualifying

Draw

Finals

Top half

Section 1

Section 2

Bottom half

Section 3

Section 4

References

External links

1992 Wimbledon Championships – Men's draws and results at the International Tennis Federation

Men's Doubles
Wimbledon Championship by year – Men's doubles